Apachekolos is a genus of robber flies in the family Asilidae, described by Martin in 1957; the genus name was explicitly designated as feminine in gender.

Species
Apachekolos clavipes 
Apachekolos confusio 
Apachekolos crinita 
Apachekolos flaventis 
Apachekolos invasa 
Apachekolos magna 
Apachekolos scapularis 
Apachekolos tenuipes 
Apachekolos volubilis 
Apachekolos vultus  
Apachekolos weslacensis

References

Further reading

 Diptera.info
 NCBI Taxonomy Browser, Apachekolos
 

Asilidae genera